Cardinals is a 2017 Canadian thriller film directed by Grayson Moore and Aidan Shipley. The film stars Sheila McCarthy as Valerie Walker, a woman who has just recently been released from prison after accidentally killing a coworker in a drunk driving accident, when Mark (Noah Reid), the son of the man she killed, shows up on her doorstep demanding answers of his own.

Cardinals, part of Telefilm Canada's Micro-Budget Production Program, was filmed in Stratford, Kitchener, and Barrie, Ontario.

The film premiered in the Discovery section at the 2017 Toronto International Film Festival.

Cast
 Sheila McCarthy as Valerie Walker
 Katie Boland as Eleanor Walker
 Grace Glowicki as Zoe Walker
 Noah Reid as Mark Loekner
 Peter MacNeill as Jim Walker
 Peter Spence as Jonah Pastekh

Awards
At the 2017 Whistler Film Festival, Moore won the award for Best Screenplay in a Borsos Competition Film.

For her performance as Valerie Walker, Sheila McCarthy won the 2018 ACTRA Toronto Award for Outstanding Performance, Female.

References

External links
 
 

2017 films
2017 thriller films
Canadian thriller films
English-language Canadian films
2010s English-language films
2010s Canadian films